Japan Centers in Russia refer to the several Japanese government-backed institutions in Russia where the Japanese language and culture courses are taught, and other Japan-related activities are supported in order to improve the Russo-Japanese relationship.

Overview
Since 1994, the Japan Centers have been established by the Ministry of Foreign Affairs of the Japanese government in six cities of Russia in order to support the market-oriented economy that was emerging. For assisting the people who might be able to participate in the Russo-Japanese exchange of business, business management and Japanese language education courses are taught at these centers.

See also
 Russo-Japanese Organizations for Trade and Investment 
 Japan External Trade Organization (JETRO) 
 Japan Foundation and its 22 centers outside of Japan, such as Maison de la culture du Japon in Paris, Japanisches Kulturinstitut in Cologne, Istituto Giapponese di Cultura in Rome, etc.

References

External links
 Japan Center in Khabarovsk
 Japan Center in Vladivostok
 Japan Center in Sakhalin
 Japan Center in Moscow
 Japan Center in St. Petersburg
 Japan Center in Nizhni-Novgorod

1994 establishments in Russia
Organizations established in 1994
Cultural organizations based in Russia
Organizations based in Moscow
Japanese culture
Japan–Russia relations